Reliance Insurance Limited, was founded in Bangladesh as a private non-life insurance company in 1988. Currently the firm has 32 branches throughout Bangladesh, and 314 employees. In the year 2021, the company had earned BDT 3,140.35 million as the gross premium income, which is higher than that of 2020. Ms. Shahnaz Rahman is the chairman of Reliance Insurance Limited.

History

In Bangladesh the insurance sector was nationalized in 1972 just after independence. Following the nationalization, the then Government established two insurance corporations. One is Bangladesh Sadharan Bima Corporation for the non-life insurance business, and another is Bangladesh Jiban Bima Corporation for life insurance business. Subsequently, the government opened the door for establishing private insurance companies through the Insurance (Amendment) Ordinance 1984.

Under the provisions of 1984 ordinance, Reliance Insurance Limited started its operation by virtue of the Certificate of Commencement of Business" issued on the 22nd of March 1988 by Registrar of Joint Stock Companies of Bangladesh. The company also enjoyed its 25th anniversary in 2014.

In 2020, the insurance company gave a 25 per cent cash dividend.

Regulatory framework

Insurance Development & Regulatory Authority of Bangladesh (IDRA), an entity formed under the Insurance Development and Regulatory Authority Act 2010, regulates all insurance companies of Bangladesh in accordance with the Insurance Act 2010.

Financial performance
Like other general insurers in Bangladesh market, the company has been affected by Covid-19 and again they earned gross premium of BDT 2,937.12 million in 2020 and gross premium in 2019 was BDT 3,004.15. The company has made an underwriting profit of BDT 470.98 million and investment income of BDT 377.64 million in the year 2020. In its 33rd Annual General Meeting (virtual), a cash dividend of 25% was distributed to its shareholders for the year 2020. Furthermore; CRISL awarded RIL "AAA" (pronounced as Triple A) surveillance rating for 2020.

Insurance services
 Marine insurance
 Property insurance & Engineering insurance
 Liability insurance & Health insurance
 Motor Insurance

Notes

Financial services companies established in 1988
Insurance companies of Bangladesh
1998 establishments in Bangladesh